"Rose of England" is a patriotic song with music by Welsh composer Ivor Novello and lyrics by Englishman Christopher Hassall, written in 1937 for their musical Crest of the Wave. 

The flower to which the song's lyrics refer is one of England's national emblems, the Tudor Rose. The popularity of "Rose of England" has led to some calls for the song to replace "God Save the Queen" as the English sporting anthem.

John Cleese used the music for his comic song I've got a ferret sticking up my nose on I'm Sorry I'll Read That Again.

The song was played by Maggie Smith in the motion picture A Private Function and by Patricia Routledge in an episode of Keeping Up Appearances.

References

1937 songs
English patriotic songs
Songs written by Ivor Novello